Individual eventing equestrian at the 2014 Asian Games was held in Dream Park Equestrian Venue, Incheon, South Korea from September 24 to 26, 2014.

Schedule
All times are Korea Standard Time (UTC+09:00)

Results
Legend
EL — Eliminated
RT — Retired
WD — Withdrawn

References

External links
Official website

Individual eventing